Chris Woods (born 1959) is an English football coach and former footballer.

Chris Woods may also refer to:

 Chris Woods (American football coach), American football coach
 Chris Woods (gridiron football) (born 1962), American gridiron football wide receiver
 Chris Woods (guitarist) British guitarist
 Chris Woods (musician) (1925–1985), American jazz saxophonist

See also
Christine Woods (born 1985), American actress
Chris Wood (disambiguation)